There have been two baronetcies created for persons with the surname Chute, one in the Baronetage of England and one in the Baronetage of the United Kingdom. Both creations are extinct.

 Chute baronets of Hinxhill Place (1684)
 Chute baronets of The Vyne (1952)

Set index articles on titles of nobility